The Children Overboard affair was an Australian political controversy involving public allegations by Howard Government ministers in the lead-up to the 2001 federal election, that seafaring asylum seekers had thrown children overboard in a presumed ploy to secure rescue and passage on 7 October 2001.

The government's handling of this and other events involving unauthorised arrivals worked to its advantage. The Tampa affair had led the government to adopt stricter border protection measures to prevent unauthorised arrivals from reaching Australia by boat. Polls indicated the measures had public support. The government was able to portray itself as "strong" on border protection measures and its opponents as "weak". In November 2001, the Liberal-National coalition was re-elected with an increased majority.

The Australian Senate Select Committee for an inquiry into a certain maritime incident later found that no children had been at risk of being thrown overboard and that the government had known this prior to the election. The government was criticised for misleading the public and cynically "(exploiting) voters' fears of a wave of illegal immigrants by demonising asylum-seekers".

Although reports indicated that the strain of being towed was the proximate cause of the asylum seeker boat eventually sinking, Australian Prime Minister John Howard asserted that the asylum seekers "irresponsibly sank the damn boat, which put their children in the water".

Background
The next day, which was the day before the issue of writs for the 2001 federal election, Immigration Minister Philip Ruddock announced that passengers of SIEV 4 had threatened to throw children overboard. This claim was later repeated by other senior government ministers including Defence Minister Peter Reith and Prime Minister Howard.

Senate inquiry

A Senate select committee inquiry, composed mainly of non-government senators, found that no children were thrown overboard from SIEV 4, that the evidence did not support the Children Overboard claim, and that the photographs purported to show children thrown into the sea were taken after SIEV 4 sank. In response, Howard said that he acted on the intelligence he was given at the time.

A minority dissenting report, authored by government senators on the committee, described the inquiry as driven by a "misplaced sense of self-righteous outrage [felt] by the Australian Labor Party at its defeat in the 2001 federal elections". An appendix to their report documented cases where passengers aboard other SIEVs had threatened children, sabotaged their own vessels, committed self-harm and, in the case of SIEV 7 on 22 October, thrown a child overboard who was rescued by another asylum seeker.

Scrafton revelations

Michael Scrafton, a former senior advisor to Peter Reith, revealed on 16 August 2004 that he told Howard on 7 November 2001 that the Children Overboard claim might be untrue. Howard said that they only discussed the inconclusive nature of the video footage. In light of the new information, the Labor opposition called for further inquiry.

On 29 August, Howard announced the 2004 federal election. On 1 September, a second inquiry composed mainly of non-government senators was convened. While the final report on 9 December found Scrafton's claims to be credible, government committee members questioned the reliability of Scrafton's recollections and wrote a minority dissenting report challenging that finding.

See also
Immigration to Australia
Jane Halton, then Chair of the People Smuggling Taskforce
Ruddock v Vadarlis
 SIEV X, which sank on 19 October 2001, just south of the Indonesian island of Java, killing 353 people

References

External links
Australian Senate – Select Committee for an inquiry into A Certain Maritime Incident
"A Certain Maritime Incident – Senate Select Committee Report, October 2002", full report (214 MB) at APH website, accessed 3 November 2018
About 45 leaked Australian NAVY photographs of the kids overboard, being rescued by the sailors
Media releases by John Howard on the Scrafton claims
Senate Select Committee on the Scrafton Evidence
"Scrafton and Howard locked in dispute over children overboard" (transcript), by Matt Brown: The World Today (ABC Local Radio), 1 September 2004.
"Indifference can be dangerous", by Shaun Carney, The Sydney Morning Herald, 8 April 2002.

2001 in Australia
International maritime incidents
Illegal immigration to Australia
Suspected Illegal Entry Vessels
Howard Government
Migrant boat incidents